Feaella perreti is a species of arachnid in the order Pseudoscorpions in the family Feaellidae. It is endemic to Kenya.

References

Feaellidae
Endemic fauna of Kenya
Animals described in 1982